Aristolycus of Athens (in Ancient Greek, Αριστόλυκος) or Aristolochos (in Ancient Greek, Αριστόλοχος)  of Athens, is listed as a victor in the stadion race of the 109th Olympiad (344 BC).

References 

Ancient Olympic competitors
4th-century BC Athenians